Betsey was a ship that was launched at Chittagong in 1803. She was abandoned off the coast of New Zealand in 1815.

Loss

On 28 December 1814 Betsey, under the command of Philip Goodenough, left Sydney for Macquarie Island, where she arrived on 13 February 1815. Goodenough landed a sealing party of thirteen men and then headed north to the Auckland Islands to undertake further sealing.  Contrary winds meant that Betsey was unable to return either to Macquarie Island or to Sydney. Food and water began to run out and the crew started to suffer from scurvy. Heavy winds drove her towards New Zealand and on 18 September heavy seas smashed Betsey's rudder. Twenty miles from the Bay of Islands, with several of his crew dead from scurvy and the remaining crew starving and parched from lack of water, Goodenough ordered the ship abandoned.  Fourteen Europeans and six lascars had left Macquarie Island. At the time of abandonment only twelve men were alive. Goodenough placed four in the jollyboat as they were so sick they could not crew a boat; the remainder took to the whaleboat, which towed the jollyboat. Goodenough then headed for New Zealand. Progress was very slow, and soon after abandoning Betsey, Goodenough ordered the rope between the jollyboat and the whaleboat to be cut. The four sick sailors were never seen again. Eventually Goodenough made land and shortly after landing a lascar died; Goodenough died shortly thereafter, on 1 November 1815.

Māori captured the six survivors, whom they eventually released to the brig Active on 23 February 1816.

Betsey itself was eventually blown ashore near Great Exhibition Bay and went to pieces.

Origins
Betsey was owned by James Underwood, but beyond that her origins are somewhat ambiguous.

One source states that she was of some 222 tons, had been built at Chittagong, India, and registered at Calcutta by Hogur & Co. An earlier source has the only Betsey being built at Chittagong being launched in 1803, of 280 tons, and being lost in the Derwent, in New South Wales.

Citations and references
Citations

References
Bateson, Charles (1972) Australian Shipwrecks - vol 1 1622-1850, (Sydney: AH and AW Reed), p. 51, 
Phipps, John, (of the Master Attendant's Office, Calcutta), (1840) A Collection of Papers Relative to Ship Building in India ...: Also a Register Comprehending All the Ships ... Built in India to the Present Time .... (Scott)

External links
 The Shipwreck Watch - the Betsey

Maritime history of Australia
Shipwrecks in the Pacific Ocean
History of New South Wales
Sailing ships
Merchant ships of India
Merchant ships of England
British ships built in India
Sealing ships
Individual sailing vessels
Maritime incidents in 1815
1803 ships
1815 in New Zealand